Martin's Battery was an artillery battery in the British Overseas Territory of Gibraltar.

Description
During World War Two there were two 4 inch and two 4 inch Quick Firing guns at Martin's Battery on the west side of the Rock of Gibraltar. Presumably named for the drunken soldier who reportedly discovered Martin's Cave in 1821.

References

Batteries in Gibraltar